Adrian Markovich Volkov (19 August 1827 – 1 February 1873) was a Russian genre painter.

Biography

The artist studied at the Imperial Academy of Arts and was a pupil of Professor Fyodor Bruni.

He died on 1 February 1873, in Saint Petersburg.

Awards
In 1858, Volkov received the title of class artist and was awarded a small gold medal of the Academy of Arts for his painting  The Obzhorny Ryad in Saint Petersburg. In 1860, he was also awarded a gold medal of the academy for his work The Interrupted Betrothal.

Gallery

References

1827 births
1873 deaths
Painters from the Russian Empire
Russian genre painters
People from Nizhny Novgorod Governorate
Imperial Academy of Arts alumni